"Rock and Roll Is Dead" is the first single released from the 1995 Lenny Kravitz album Circus. The song reached the top 20 in Canada, Finland, New Zealand, and Spain, but it underperformed in the United States, peaking at number 75 on the Billboard Hot 100.

Content
Kravitz told on the meaning of "Rock and Roll Is Dead":

Critical reception
Pan-European magazine Music & Media wrote, "Borrowing half of the riff from Led Zeppelin's Heartbreaker is not exactly the way to back up the statement he's making here. By going retro again, Kravitz reanimates rock totally. DJ Hans Van Rijn at Danish radio station The Voice/Copenhagen said, "As rock is still very big in Scandinavia, it will be a big radio hit. It's typical of him, the way it's structured. Although playable in all day slots, in the evening it will do best on EHR stations which pretend to cater to youth." Kravitz was nominated for a Grammy Award for Best Male Rock Vocal Performance for this song in 1996.

Chart performance
The song reached number 75 on the US Billboard Hot 100 and number 22 on the UK Singles Chart. It was a top-10 hit in Finland, New Zealand and Spain, reaching numbers 10, eight, and five, respectively. In Canada, the song reached number 16. Elsewhere, the song reached the top 40 in Australia, the Netherlands, and Switzerland.

Music video
The music video for "Rock and Roll Is Dead" was storyboarded by Andrew Trovaioli and directed by Ruven Afanador. The video shows Kravitz performing the song with his band, as well as Kravitz with visual artistic related backgrounds.

Track listings

US and Canadian CD single; US cassette single
 "Rock and Roll Is Dead" – 3:22
 "Another Life" – 3:59
 "Are You Gonna Go My Way" (live) – 4:00

UK CD and 10-inch single
 "Rock and Roll Is Dead" – 3:22
 "Another Life" – 4:21
 "Confused" – 6:48
 "Is It Me, Is It You?" – 3:54

UK cassette single and European CD single
 "Rock and Roll Is Dead" – 3:22
 "Another Life" – 4:21

Japanese mini-CD single
 "Rock and Roll Is Dead" – 3:24
 "God Is Love" – 4:26

Charts

Release history

References

External links
 Lenny Kravitz official site
Official video on YouTube

1995 singles
Lenny Kravitz songs
Song recordings produced by Lenny Kravitz
Songs written by Lenny Kravitz